Conceptual photography  is a type of photography that illustrates an idea. There have been illustrative photographs made since the medium's invention, for example in the earliest staged photographs, such as Hippolyte Bayard's Self Portrait as a Drowned Man (1840). However, the term conceptual photography derives from conceptual art, a movement of the late 1960s. Today the term is used to describe either a methodology or a genre.

Conceptual photography as a methodology
As a methodology conceptual photography is a type of photography that is staged to represent an idea. The 'concept' is both preconceived and, if successful, understandable in the completed image. It is most often seen in advertising and illustration where the picture may reiterate a headline or catchphrase that accompanies it. Photographic advertising and illustration commonly derive from Stock photography, which is often produced in response to current trends in image usage as determined by the research of picture agencies like Getty Images or Corbis. These photographs are therefore produced to visualize a predetermined concept. The advent of picture editing software like Adobe Photoshop has allowed the greater manipulation of images to seamlessly combine elements that previously it would only have been possible to combine in graphic illustration.

Conceptual photography as a genre
The term 'conceptual photography' used to describe a genre may refer to the use of photography in conceptual art or in contemporary art photography. In either case, the term is not widely used or consistently applied.

Conceptual photography and conceptual art
Conceptual art of the late 1960s and early 1970s often involved photography to document performances, ephemeral sculpture or actions. The artists did not describe themselves as photographers, for example Edward Ruscha said "Photography's just a playground for me. I'm not a photographer at all." These artists are sometimes referred to as conceptual photographers but those who used photography extensively such as John Hilliard and John Baldessari and Pedram Mousavi are more often described as photoconceptualists or "artists using photography".

Conceptual photography and fine-art photography

Since the 1970s artists using photography like Cindy Sherman and latterly Thomas Ruff and Thomas Demand have been described as conceptual. Although their work does not generally resemble the lo-fi aesthetic of 1960s conceptual art they may use certain methods in common such as documenting performance (Sherman), typological or serial imagery (Ruff) or the restaging of events (Demand). In fact the indebtedness to these and other approaches from conceptual art is so widespread in contemporary fine-art photography that almost any work might be described as conceptual. The term has perhaps been used most specifically in a negative sense to distinguish some contemporary art photography from documentary photography or photojournalism. This distinction has been made in the coverage of the Deutsche Börse Photography Prize. Conceptual photography is often used interchangeably with fine-art photography, and there has been some dispute about whether there is a difference between the two. However, the central school of thought is that conceptual photography is a type of fine-art photography. Fine art photography is inclusive of conceptual photography. While all conceptual photography is fine art, not all fine art is conceptual.

References

External links
 What is Conceptual Photography? – themed films at Source Magazine
 Conceptual Art and Photography – Article at The Metropolitan Museum of Art
 What is Conceptual Photography? – Article at Wisegeek

Photography by genre
Conceptual art